The Shakh Fazil Archaeological Complex is located in the village Safedbulan, Jalal-Abad Region of Kyrgyzstan.  It is a sacred Muslim site, and an annual mass pilgrimage occurs here. The name of the main building in many scholarly sources is the Tomb of Shah Fadl, and this is a major Qarakhanid tomb probably built between 1050–1060.

Site description
The collection of sites is made up of the Shakh Fazil Mausoleum, Safed-Bulan Mausoleum, the holy mountain of Archa Mazar,  Alamberdar Mausoleum, holy hermit's cave, an 18th/19th-century Mosque, and vertical stone phallos. The mausoleum of Shakh Fazil, the most important site in the collection, is unique in its own right and stands apart from other Karakhanid-era mausolea.

World Heritage status

This site was added as an individual entry to the UNESCO World Heritage Tentative List of Kyrgyzstan on January 29, 2001 in the Cultural category. The individual enty was removed from the list in 2010, and Shakh Fazil was instead included in the serial entry "Silk Roads Sites in Kyrgyzstan".

Notes

References
Shakh-Fazil, UNESCO World Heritage Centre, archived in web.archive.org on February 24, 2007.
Sheila Blair. The Monumental Inscriptions from Early Islamic Iran and Transoxiana. Brill, 1992, pp. 128–29.
Vladimir N. Nastich. A NEW GLANCE AT THE ATTRIBUTION OF SHÂH FÂZIL (FERGHANA). Article published in Islamic Art Resources in Central Asia and Eastern and Central Europe. Proceedings of the Fifth International Seminar for Islamic Art and Architecture (Mafraq, Āl al-Bayt University 2000), p. 45–49. Online at: academia.edu
 Shah Fadl Tomb. 

Archaeological sites in Kyrgyzstan
Ancient Central Asia